Blasicrura pallidula, common name the little pallid cowry, is a species of sea snail, a cowry, a marine gastropod mollusk in the family Cypraeidae, the cowries.

Subspecies
Blasicrura pallidula luchuana Kuroda, 1960
Blasicrura pallidula pallidula (Gaskoin, 1849-a)
Blasicrura pallidula rhinoceros (Souverbie, 1865)
Blasicrura pallidula vivia Steadmand and Cotton, 1943

Description
Blasicrura pallidula has a shell reaching a size of 11 – 32 mm. It  is oval, the dorsum surface is usually pale brown, while the base is white. In the living cowries the mantle has a blackish coloration.

Distribution
This species can be found in North Australia, Philippines, New Caledonia, Samoan Islands and rarely seen in the Maldives.

References
 WoRMS
 Biolib
 
 Cypraea.eu

External links
 Underwaterkwaj

Cypraeidae
Gastropods described in 1849